Somalis in Yemen make up the historical Somali population in Yemen.  Around 500,000 Somalis live in Yemen, of which 266,000 are refugees.

History 
Many Somalis and Yemenis can trace back their ancestry to a unspecified homeland. Many Somalis fled to Yemen during the Somali Civil War.

Demographics 
There are around 500,000 Somalis in Yemen, mostly concentrated around Aden.  There are also some on Soqotra Island.  Many Somalis in Yemen feel welcomed by the Yemeni people.  Many Somalis in Yemen now speak Arabic instead of their native Somali language due to language shift.

See also 
 Somalia–Yemen relations

References 

Somalia–Yemen relations